Cross is an unincorporated community atop the Allegheny Plateau in the western part of Mineral County, West Virginia, United States. It is part of the Cumberland, MD-WV Metropolitan Statistical Area. Cross is located just east of Jennings Randolph Lake on West Virginia Route 46.

References 

Unincorporated communities in Mineral County, West Virginia
Unincorporated communities in West Virginia